Whitefield Square is one of the 22 squares of Savannah, Georgia, United States. It is located in the southernmost row of the city's five rows of squares, on Habersham Street and East Wayne Street, and was the final square laid out, in 1851. It is south of Troup Square and east of Calhoun Square in the southeastern corner of Savannah's grid of squares. The oldest building on the square is at 412–414 East Taylor Street, which dates to 1855.

It is named for the Rev. George Whitefield (whose last name is pronounced Whitfield), founder of Bethesda Home for Boys (a residential education program – formerly the Bethesda Orphanage) in the 18th century, and still in existence on the south side of the city.

The square has a gazebo in its center.

A notable building facing the western side of the square is the First Congregational Church. Other prominent, though 20th-century, buildings are the Rose-of-Sharon Apartments (which occupies the entire northwestern tything block) and, across Habersham Street, the Red Cross Building.

The square, and its immediate vicinity, was once a burial ground for both negro slaves and free persons of all colors. The original 1805 burial ground included the northern end of today's square, a half block to the north and one block to the west, It was extended in 1812 to the northwest and in 1818 to the south, this time incorporating the southern end of today's square. Due to this connection, a movement was started in 2021 to rename the square Jubilee Square, after Jubilee Freedom Day, the day when General William Sherman arrived in Savannah in 1864 to begin enforcing Abraham Lincoln's Emancipation Proclamation.

Andrew Bryan, the founder of the First African Baptist Church, was buried in the square, as was Henry Cunningham, the minister of the Second African Baptist Church.

Dedication

Constituent buildings

Each building below is in one of the eight blocks around the square composed of four residential "tything" blocks and four civic ("trust") blocks, now known as the Oglethorpe Plan. They are listed with construction years where known.

Northwestern civic/trust block
First Congregational Church, 421 Habersham Street (1895)

Southwestern civic/trust block
431 Habersham Street (1886)
Mary Dwyer Property, 427–431 Habersham Street (1886)
Beth Eden Baptist Church, 302 East Gordon Street (1893)

Southwestern residential/tything block
John Entelman Property (1), 433 Habersham Street (1896)
435 Habersham Street (1896)
John Entelman Property (2), 437 Habersham Street (1897)
439 Habersham Street (1897)
Henry Herman House, 313 East Gordon Street (1861)
307–309 East Gordon Street (1869)
436–442 Lincoln Street (1867)

Northeastern residential/tything block
John McCluskey House, 408 East Taylor Street (1891)
Andrew Nelson House, 410 East Taylor Street (1860)
George Ash Duplex, 412–414 East Taylor Street (1855) – oldest building on the square
415A–D Price Street (1876)

Northeastern civic/tything block
415–419 East Taylor Street (1888)
424–426 Habersham Street (1896)

Southeastern civic/tything block
430–432 Habersham Street (1886)
Abraham Samuels Row House, 414–420 Habersham Street (1888)
407–413 East Gordon Street (1890)

Southeastern residential/tything block
Sarah Sexton Property (1), 401 East Gordon Street (1901)
Sarah Sexton Property (2), 403 East Gordon Street (1890)
Emma Hunter House, 405 East Gordon Street (1895)
407–411 East Gordon Street (1890)
415–419 East Gordon Street (1886)
Sarah Sexton Property (3), 440 Habersham Street (1902)

Gallery

References

Whitefield Square, Savannah
1851 establishments in Georgia (U.S. state)